Karaj is a city in Alborz Province, Iran.

Karaj may also refer to:
 Karaj, Ardabil
 Karaj-e Olya, Kermanshah Province
 Karaj-e Sofla, Kermanshah Province
 Karaj County, in Alborz Province
 Karaj River
 Anand_Karaj, the Sikh marriage ceremony, meaning "Blissful Union" or "Joyful Union"